The following lists events that happened during 2016 in Jordan.

Incumbents 

 Monarch - Abdullah II
 Prime Minister - Abdullah Ensour, and Hani Mulki

Events

May 

 29 May - Parliament is dissolved by King Abdullah.

September 

 20 September - 2016 Jordanian general election.

November 

 4 November - King Faisal Air Base shooting
 7 November - Abdullah II of Jordan opens the 18th Parliament of Jordan with his speech from the throne.

December 

 18 December - 2016 Al-Karak attack

References 

 *
2010s in Jordan
Jordan
Years of the 21st century in Jordan
Jordan